The 1994 Rhode Island Rams football team was an American football team that represented the University of Rhode Island in the Yankee Conference during the 1994 NCAA Division I-AA football season. In their second season under head coach Floyd Keith, the Rams compiled a 2–9 record (2–6 against conference opponents) and finished in a tie for last place in the New England Division of the Yankee Conference.

Schedule

References

Rhode Island
Rhode Island Rams football seasons
Rhode Island Rams football